Threatmantics are a Welsh band from Cardiff, Wales. The band's current members are Heddwyn Davies (vocals, viola), Andrew Lewis (guitar), Gareth Middleton (bass) and Huw Alun Davies (drums). Their first album Upbeat Love was recorded whilst the band was still a three-piece (Heddwyn, Ceri & Huw) and was released by Domino Records' subsidiary label Double Six Records on 3 November 2008. Stereogum named Threatmantics a Band To Watch on 13 November 2008. The band's long-awaited second album, Kid McCoy, was released in late 2012. The singles from it got heavy airplay on BBC Radio Wales and BBC Radio Cymru and were also played on BBC Radio 6 Music. DJ Adam Walton included "Esgryn" on his "Best of 2012" list.

Line-up changes
Heddwyn, Huw & Luke                      (2005)
Heddwyn, Huw & Franic                    (2005–2006)
Heddwyn, Huw & Ceri                      (2006–2009)
Heddwyn, Huw & Mark                      (2009)
Heddwyn, Huw, Andrew & Taliesyn          (2009–2010)
Heddwyn, Andrew, Taliesyn, Gareth & Dan  (2010)
Heddwyn, Andrew, Taliesyn, Gareth & Huw  (2010)
Heddwyn, Andrew, Gareth & Huw            (2010 – present)

Discography

Albums
 Upbeat Love (3 November 2008)
 Kid McCoy (10 December 2012, though was available online from 29 November)

Singles
"Little Bird" - Digital Only (February 2009)
"Big Man" - 7" (October 2008)
"Sali Mali" / "Wedi Marw" - 7" (August 2007)
"Don't Care" - CD (March 2007)
"Apple Tree" (2012)
"Esgryn" (2012)

References

External links
Official website
Domino artist page
Threatmantics Myspace site
BBC video coverage of Threatmantics on the Introducing Stage at Glastonbury Festival 2008

Welsh alternative rock groups
Neo-psychedelia groups
Welsh-language bands
Musical groups from Cardiff
Double Six Records artists